Cross Creek Mall is a regional shopping mall located in Fayetteville, North Carolina, on the 401 Bypass between Morganton Road and the All-American Freeway. Its anchors include Belk, Macy's, and J. C. Penney. The mall is owned by CBL & Associates Properties.

History
The mall's land was bought in 1970 by Henry Faison, a Charlotte-based developer. The All American Freeway was planned at the time, but the area was predominantly farmland. Construction of the freeway began in May 1974, nine months before the mall opened on February 26, 1975. The mall opened with five anchors, three of which moved from downtown Fayetteville: Sears, Belk Hensdale, and JC Penney; Miller & Rhoads and Thalhimer's, were new to the area. Miller & Rhoads closed in 1985. Thalhimer's became Hecht's in 1992, which in turn became Macy's in 2006.

On October 15, 2018, it was announced that Sears would be closing as part of a plan to close 142 stores nationwide.

References

External links 
 

Shopping malls in North Carolina
Shopping malls established in 1975
Buildings and structures in Fayetteville, North Carolina
CBL Properties
Tourist attractions in Cumberland County, North Carolina